Gasha (Gaşa) is a rural locality (a selo) in Alkhadzhakentsky Selsoviet, Kayakentsky District, Republic of Dagestan, Russia. The population was 54 as of 2010.

Geography 
Gasha is located 27 km southwest of Novokayakent (the district's administrative centre) by road. Alkhadzhakent and Mamaaul are the nearest rural localities.

Nationalities 
Kumyks live there.

References 

Rural localities in Kayakentsky District